Yevhen Anatoliyovych Braslavets (born 11 September 1972 in Dnipropetrovsk, Ukrainian SSR) is a Ukrainian sailor and Olympic champion.

He won a gold medal in the 470 Class at the 1996 Summer Olympics in Atlanta, together with Ihor Matviyenko.

References

External links
 
 
 

1972 births
Living people
Ukrainian male sailors (sport)
Olympic sailors of Ukraine
Sailors at the 1996 Summer Olympics – 470
Sailors at the 2000 Summer Olympics – 470
Olympic gold medalists for Ukraine
Olympic medalists in sailing
Sportspeople from Dnipro
Medalists at the 1996 Summer Olympics
470 class world champions
World champions in sailing for Ukraine
20th-century Ukrainian people